1887 was the 101st season of cricket in England since the foundation of Marylebone Cricket Club (MCC). Surrey was the leading county for the first time in over twenty years, a status they would retain until 1892.

Champion County

 Surrey

Playing record (by county)

Leading batsmen (qualification 20 innings)

Leading bowlers (qualification 1,000 balls)

Notable events
The driest English cricket season since 1870, combined with improvements to pitches from the heavy roller, allowed for a large number of notable batting feats:
 Five batsmen with twenty or more innings averaged over 40. Before 1887, no more than two had ever done so in one season.
 W.G. Grace for the third time reached 2,000 runs; an aggregate not reached by any other batsman until 1893.
 Arthur Shrewsbury averaged 78.71 for twenty-three innings, beating W.G. Grace's 1871 record of 78.25. This was not beaten until Robert Poore averaged 91.23 in 1899.
 Shrewsbury's innings of 267 against Middlesex, at 615 minutes, remains the longest innings ever played in a county match.
 Walter Read became the first batsman to play two consecutive innings of over 200, scoring 247 against Lancashire and 244 against Cambridge University
 For the last time until 1970, no bowler took nine wickets in an innings, with the best analysis being eight for 26 by Dick Barlow.
 As a result of some extremely bad results (only three wins and twenty-nine losses from thirty-five games) and financial trouble, Derbyshire were demoted from first-class status at the end of the season, not to return until 1895.
 An unofficial points system of one point for a win and half a point for a draw was devised by the "Cricket Reporting Agency" as a replacement for the former method of fewest matches lost to decide the "Champion County". Along with a more rigid schedule, it became the ancestor of the official County Championship from 1890 onwards.

Notes
An unofficial seasonal title sometimes proclaimed by consensus of media and historians prior to December 1889 when the official County Championship was constituted.  Although there are ante-dated claims prior to 1873, when residence qualifications were introduced, it is only since that ruling that any quasi-official status can be ascribed.
The 1887 season saw an unofficial point system of 1 point for a win and 0.5 points for a draw devised by the "Cricket Reporting Agency"

References

Annual reviews
 James Lillywhite’s Cricketers' Annual (Red Lilly), Lillywhite, 1888
 John Wisden's Cricketers' Almanack  1888

External links
 CricketArchive – season summaries

1887 in English cricket
English cricket seasons in the 19th century